Imperial Pacific International Holdings Limited ( is a Chinese investment holding company. It was founded with headquarters in Hong Kong and originally named First Natural Foods Holdings until it was renamed in May 2014. It is majority owned by Cui Lijie through her investment vehicle Inventive Star Limited.

History
First Natural Foods was first listed on the main board of the Hong Kong Stock Exchange on 11 February 2002. It was principally involved most aspects of the food business, including frozen and functional food products. Trading for the group was suspended on 15 December 2008 and provisional liquidators were appointed on 7 January 2009 for restructuring. The liquidators were discharged on 4 September 2012 and trade sharing resumed the following day.

In 2013, the Securities and Futures Commission (SFC) took the company's founder and former chairman Yeung Chung-lung to court for alleged embezzlement. The SFC accused him of withdrawing HK$84 million from its account in December 2008.

In December 2013, First Natural Foods announced that it would buy the Macau-based junket operator Hengsheng for HK$400 million. In 2013, First Natural Foods reported a profit of only 1.25 million.  In March 2016, Imperial Pacific announced that it would sell its non-gaming subsidiaries to focus on its gaming businesses. In August 2016, Imperial Pacific reported that it had a half-year net profit of HK$837.3 million (US$108 million). Imperial Pacific was Trump inaugural Gala sponsor.

In 2017, the Federal Bureau of Investigation (FBI) raided the construction site of Imperial Pacific's casino in Saipan over a "federal violation of the workplace visa system" following the death of a construction worker in March 2017. Construction workers from a subsidiary of state-owned China Metallurgical Group Corporation were unlawfully employed on the island to build the casino. In April 2017, Bloomberg News reported that the United States Department of Justice was investigating Imperial Pacific for money laundering. The FBI executed search warrants on Imperial Pacific's offices in Saipan again in March 2018.

In April 2019, the United States Department of Labor secured a $3.3 million judgment against Imperial Pacific for wage and overtime violations. In September 2019, the Equal Employment Opportunity Commission filed a lawsuit against Imperial Pacific for sexual harassment and discrimination.

In November 2019, the FBI raided the offices of Imperial Pacific for evidence of money laundering and wire fraud, and a federal grand jury subpoenaed the company regarding a corruption probe involving links with Northern Mariana Islands governor Ralph Torres.

In March 2020, Imperial Pacific disclosed that the Financial Crimes Enforcement Network was probing it for possible violations of the Bank Secrecy Act. In June 2020, the Commonwealth Casino Commission of the Northern Mariana Islands announced that it was seeking to suspend Imperial Pacific's casino license for non-payment of money owed to a community benefit fund.

Best Sunshine International 
Best Sunshine, a subsidiary of Imperial Pacific International Holdings, develops and operates casinos, hotels, and restaurants in the Commonwealth of the Northern Mariana Islands (CNMI). , it is reportedly the largest taxpayer in the CNMI, paying US$27.8 million in business gross revenue tax.

In August 2014, Imperial Pacific International was granted a 25-year license to build and operate a casino on Saipan with an option to extend the license for another 15 years. Best Sunshine originally planned to spend US$3.14 billion and operate 2,229 hotel room. but increased the budget to US$7.1 billion the following month to accommodate plans to operate more than 4,200 hotel rooms and 1,600 gaming tables. Imperial Pacific raised US$99.8 million in December 2014 to fund these projects.

Best Sunshine had a soft opening for a temporary casino with six Baccarat tables in July 2015. This casino, named Best Sunshine Live cost US$25 million to build. It is located in Saipan's DFS T-Galleria Mall. In May 2016, Best Sunshine started targeting residents and tourists of Guam by offering charter flights between the two islands.  The Best Sunshine Live casino opened on 31 March 2017, though construction for the attached resort continued.

The main casino, named Grand Mariana Casino Hotel and Resort was constructed in Garapan in 2016 and 2017. During this time, the Bureau of Environmental and Coastal Quality (BECQ) gave Best Sunshine multiple fines for discharging wastewater into Garapan's lagoon and violating work hour constraints. Ancient human remains were discovered on the construction site, which will be re-interred some time after construction is finished.  The main casino was originally scheduled to open in December 2016 and expected to cost US$550 million. The resort's casino had a soft opening on 6 July 2017.

On 23 March 2017, one of Imperial Pacific's Chinese construction workers fell off a scaffold and died. This led the FBI to search one of Imperial Pacific's offices and make an arrest.  On 15 February 2018, Bloomberg Businessweek published an investigative report on the circumstances surrounding the death of this construction worker. An attorney for the Torres Brothers law firm which represented this worker said the report omitted several facts about the case. Imperial Pacific disputed all allegations of wrongdoing and sued Bloomberg for defamation. The FBI and U.S. Department of Homeland Security investigated the case and charged five individuals with harboring undocumented workers.

After Typhoon Yutu, Imperial Pacific opened its Saipan casino with limited operations from 2–15 November 2018. Citing damages from the typhoon, Imperial Pacific shut down this casino from 16 to 18 November, and then resumed operations.

References

External links 
 

Conglomerate companies of Hong Kong
Companies listed on the Hong Kong Stock Exchange
Companies based in Fujian
Food and drink companies of China
Gambling companies of Macau
Tourist attractions in the Northern Mariana Islands
Chinese companies established in 2002
Food and drink companies established in 2002